"Saturday Night" is a song by Italian Eurodance project Whigfield, fronted by Danish-born Sannie Charlotte Carlson. It was first released in 1992 in Italy and 1993 in Spain through Prodisc. Throughout 1994, it was released across the rest of Europe and experienced worldwide success. The song was written by Italian producers Larry Pignagnoli and Davide Riva, and produced by Pignagnoli. In 1994, the song was included on Carlson's debut album, Whigfield.

The single entered at number one on the UK Singles Chart, making Whigfield the first artist to enter at the top in the UK with their debut single, dethroning Wet Wet Wet's 15-week chart-topper "Love Is All Around". As of October 2015, "Saturday Night" has sold a total of 1.18 million copies in the UK. It also reached number one in Germany, Ireland, Spain and Switzerland, and it became a top-10 hit in Austria, Denmark, France, Iceland, Italy, the Netherlands, Norway and Sweden. In Spain the single spent 11 weeks at the top position. Outside Europe, it peaked at number three in Zimbabwe, number 19 on the US Billboard Hot Dance Club Play chart and number 78 in Australia.

NME magazine ranked "Saturday Night" at number 15 in their list of the 50 best songs of 1994. It was also nominated for Best Single, while Whigfield was nominated for Best New Act on the 7th annual Smash Hits Awards in 1995.

Background and composition
Whigfield (AKA Sannie Charlotte Carlson) studied fashion design in Copenhagen and went to Bologna in Italy where she worked as a model by day and as a PR girl for clubs at night. One of the club DJs, Davide Riva, was part of a music production duo. He persuaded her to sing for them. She then visited Italian producer Larry Pignagnoli in his studio and performed a song sample. He hired her to record "Saturday Night" and she chose the name Whigfield after an old teacher in Denmark. Larry Pignagnoli already had success with Spagna in the late 1980s and early 1990s before he produced "Saturday Night" with Whigfield. With lyrics written by Pignagnoli in three days, the duo did over 20 takes, then they spliced the best bits together.

Reviews categorized "Saturday Night" as a melodic bubblegum-influenced pop-dance and Euro-pop track. James Hamilton from the magazine's RM Dance Update compared it to "Do Wah Diddy Diddy". "Saturday Night" includes a rave-tinted rhythm section, chirpy female vocals, and a house piano at its fade-out. According to Whigfield, "Saturday Night" is "like a nursery rhyme, with lyrics about what girls do when they're getting ready to go out, and about getting hot when they’re out dancing." The "Dee dee na na na" was initially done as a joke, before they incorporated it as a initial hook. They chose to release the song for its simple, upbeat and club-ready nature, titling it "Saturday Night" to reflect that. The lyrical subject led Simon Cowell to compare it to Rebecca Black's "Friday", stating that they are "what we call a 'hair-dryer song'; a song girls sing into their hair dryers as they're getting ready to go out".

Release and commercial performance
Initially, no record companies were interested in publishing "Saturday Night". After it was played frequently in the Spanish radio show World Dance Music, interest in the song began to increase. The first label to pick up the song was a small label, Prodisc in Valencia. It was first released in Italy in 1992, then became a number-one hit in Spain at the end of 1993. In the summer of 1994, it became a hit with British holidaymakers on the continent, leading to a huge demand for the track in the United Kingdom. Whigfield was signed for the UK in February 1994 by Christian Tattersfield and Ben Kahn who run London offshoot Systematic. The label decided to delay the release in order to capitalise on the inevitable buzz built up among British tourists returning from summer holidays in mainland Europe. The single was not released in North America until February 1995. 

"Saturday Night" was released in the UK on 5 September 1994, and went straight to number one - dethroning Wet Wet Wet's 15 week chart-topper "Love Is All Around" on 11 September, despite that single increasing its sales from 65,000 the previous week to 104,000, when "Saturday Night" entered at number one with sales of 150,000. Whigfield was the first act to enter at number one in the United Kingdom chart with her début single. It stayed at number one for a total of four weeks selling 680,000 in the process, went on to become the second best selling single of the year, and has sold a total of 1.18 million copies. "Saturday Night" is also the 15th biggest-selling single by a female artist in the United Kingdom. It also was a No. 1 hit in Germany, Ireland, Spain and Switzerland, and a No. 2 hit in Denmark, France, Iceland, Italy and Norway. In Spain, the single spent a total of 11 weeks at number-one. Additionally, it reached the top 10 also in Austria (4), the Netherlands (7) and Sweden (9), while it was a top 20 hit in Belgium (14). Outside Europe, it peaked at number-one on the RPM Dance/Urban chart in Canada, No. 3 in Israel and Zimbabwe, No. 19 on the Billboard Hot Dance Club Play chart in the United States and No. 78 in Australia.

Critical reception
"Saturday Night" was well-received by professional critics, both contemporaneous and retrospective pieces labeling the track as "irresistible", "catchy", and "infectious". Larry Flick from Billboard wrote that it "is a giddy pop/dance ditty that has already saturated radio airwaves throughout Europe. It also has gotten early spins on crossover stations in Los Angeles, Chicago, and Nashville—and rightly so. The tune has a simple, but killer hook that is matched by a jumpy, rave-coated rhythm section and chirpy female vocals." Another editor, Mark Dezzani, declared it an "teen anthem". Chris Heath from The Daily Telegraph felt it's "pleasantly annoying", saying, "It's pop music. Don't be too cool to enjoy it." David Balls from Digital Spy noted its "feelgood Euro beats and memorable dance routine". Tom Ewing of Freaky Trigger complimented it for being "one of those iconically simple pop hits" and for its "resistibility". He also added that the song is "charmingly unassuming, thanks mainly to Whigfield's matter-of-fact performance. If you do stick around, your reward is a lovely bit of house piano heading for the fade. But this song is never pushy. It's Saturday night. Whigfield is having a great time." Gavin Hills from The Observer viewed it as "wonderful", British magazine Music Week called it "delightful frothy pop", and Stephen Meade from The Network Forty considered it as "exciting".

Music video
The official music video for "Saturday Night" was directed by La La Land. It features numerous different scenes of Whigfield standing in front of a mirror, getting ready to go out on Saturday night. She's blow-drying her wet hair, before she braids it and puts on make-up. In some scenes, she flips through pictures of different men and selects one (GG Allin) of them, which she kisses and attaches to the mirror. In the video for her next single, "Another Day", the same image appears, this time in a frame. Other scenes also show the singer trying to decide which clothes to wear, before she goes for a black singlet. The video was A-listed on Germany's VIVA in September 1994. In December 2022, it had generated more than 111 million views on YouTube.

Associated dance routine
There is a dance routine which is commonly performed to the song (particularly at parties and nightclubs in the United Kingdom), the origins of which are uncertain. Some suggest that it began as an aerobic routine created by a gym instructor to accompany the song at a holiday resort, and followed the song back to the UK. The dance does not appear in the music video for the song, however it was performed by backing dancers during Whigfield's performance on Top of the Pops on 15 September 1994.

Whigfield stated in an interview with Justin Myers for the Official Charts Company, "I remember I did some promotion in this place north of Madrid and when I was doing the track [I] saw everybody doing this thing and they all jumped at the same time. I hadn’t even known about the dance until then... I still remember the dance, but I didn’t do it. I thought it was kind of nice that it was just the people doing it."

Allegations of plagiarism
Two claims of plagiarism were made. It was alleged that the track ripped off both "Rub a Dub Dub" by the Equals and "Fog on the Tyne" by Lindisfarne. Both claims were dismissed.

Impact and legacy
The Guardian ranked "Saturday Night" number 91 in their list of "The 100 greatest UK No. 1s" in 2020. NME ranked it number 15 in their list of the "50 best songs of 1994". Smash Hits nominated the song and act in the categories for Best New Single and Best New Act on the 7th annual Smash Hits Awards in 1995. The song was played in the British TV series Everything I Know About Love (2022–present).

Track listings

 CD single – UK [SYSCD3]
 "Saturday Night" (radio mix)
 "Saturday Night" (extended nite mix)
 "Saturday Night" (nite mix)
 "Saturday Night" (beagle mix)
 "Saturday Night" (dida mix)
 "Saturday Night" (deep nite mix)
 "Saturday Night" (trance beat mix)

 CD single – Australia (1997)
 "Saturday Night" (radio mix) – 4:06
 "Saturday Night" (Nite Mix) – 5:29
 "Saturday Night" (Extended Nite Mix) – 5:54
 "Saturday Night" (classic vocal remix - US remix) – 9:15
 "Mega Pix Mix" 4:28

 CD maxi – Remixes
 "Saturday Night" (trance beat remix) – 4:44
 "Saturday Night" (afternoon) – 4:40
 "Saturday Night" (deep night remix) – 5:45
 "Saturday Night" (extended nite remix) – 5:55
 "Saturday Night" (radio mix) – 4:07

 CD US maxi-single
 "Saturday Night" (Remix) – 5:55
 "Saturday Night" (Deep Nite Mix) – 5:45
 "Saturday Night" (Beagle Mix) – 4:55
 "Saturday Night" (Classic Vocal Mix - remixed by Darrin Friedman & Hex Hector) – 9:15
 "Saturday Night" (Spike Vocal Mix - remixed by Darrin Friedman & Hex Hector) – 7:28
 "Saturday Night" (Dida Mix) – 4:36

Charts

Weekly charts

Year-end charts

Certifications

Release history

References

1992 debut singles
1992 songs
1993 singles
1994 singles
English-language Italian songs
European Hot 100 Singles number-one singles
Irish Singles Chart number-one singles
Music videos directed by La La Land
Number-one singles in Germany
Number-one singles in Scotland
Number-one singles in Spain
Number-one singles in Switzerland
Scotland national football team songs
Songs involved in plagiarism controversies
Songs written by Larry Pignagnoli
UK Singles Chart number-one singles
Whigfield songs
ZYX Music singles